99.3 Spirit FM (DWTJ 99.3 MHz) is an FM station owned and operated by Alaminos Community Broadcasting Corporation, the media arm of the Roman Catholic Diocese of Alaminos. Its studios and radio transmitter are located at Opifices Christi, #140 Mapila-pila Rd., Brgy. Tambacan, Burgos, Pangasinan.

References

External links
Spirit FM Pangasinan FB Page

Radio stations in Dagupan
Radio stations established in 1985
Catholic radio stations